are frontispieces of books, especially woodblock printed frontispieces for Japanese romance novels and literary magazines published from the 1890s to the 1910s.

They usually portrayed women and were bound to the book's spine or inserted into literary magazines to give readers a sense of what type of stories were to unfold. Most  were woodblock prints in romance novels intended for a female audience. Some were lithographs, and some were inserted into other types of literature. The first mass-produced publication to regularly feature  designs popular literary magazine , with over 230 individual inserted from 1895 to 1914.

The general standard of  prints is remarkably high. Made at a time of well developed woodblock printing techniques, it is thought the addition of these prints contributed to almost half the cost of production. Still, the genre is under-appreciated as an artfrom by the majority of print collectors. The standard text on the subject is Merritt and Yamada's Woodblock  Prints—Reflections of Meiji Culture (2000).

Practitioners
Artists who designed  include Hirezaki Eiho, Ikeda Shoen, Kaburagi Kiyokata, Kajita Hanko, Mishima Shoso, Mizuno Toshikata, Odake Kokkan, Ogata Gekko, Suzuki Kason, Takeuchi Keishu, Terasaki Kogyo, Tomioka Eisen, Tsutsui Toshimine, Utagawa Kunimatsu, Watanabe Seitei, and Yamada Keichu.

Translation
The word  is usually translated into English as mouth picture.

Gallery

References
 Newland, Amy Reigle. (2005). Hotei Encyclopedia of Japanese Woodblock Prints.  Amsterdam: Hotei
 Merritt, Helen and Yamada Nanako, Woodblock Kuchi-e Prints--Reflections of Meiji Culture, University of Hawaii Press, Honolulu, 2000, 
 Nanako, Yamada, "Beauties as Frontispieces" in Daruma Magazine, Issue 32, Vol. 8, No. 4, pp. 40–48, 2001

Footnotes

External links

 "Kuchi-e," or Literary Magazine Frontispieces Ukiyo-e Gallery
 Making a kuchi-e print Video by David Bull (34 mins)

Arts in Japan
Printmaking
Ukiyo-e genres